Liu Xing (Traditional: 劉星; Simplified: 刘星; Pinyin: Liú Xīng; born December 10, 1984) is a Chinese professional Go player.

Biography
Liu started to learn Go at the age of 6. He turned professional in 1995, and joined the Chinese national squad in 1997. He was promoted to 7 dan in 2005.

Titles & runners-up

References 

1984 births
Living people
Chinese Go players
Asian Games medalists in go
Go players at the 2010 Asian Games
Sportspeople from Tianjin

Asian Games silver medalists for China
Medalists at the 2010 Asian Games